The 2016 FIH Masters Hockey World Cup was a field hockey event held between 29 March – 6 April in Canberra, Australia. The event comprised a series of tournaments in both male and female competitions.

The most successful men's teams at the 2016 FIH Masters Hockey World Cup were Australia and England, who each won two titles, while the Australian women's teams were the most successful winning three of five titles.

Age Groups
Across both the men's and women's tournaments, a total five age groups were played:

Men
Over 40's
Over 45's
Over 50's
Over 55's
Women
Over 40's
Over 45's
Over 50's
Over 55's
Over 60's

Results

Men

Summaries

Women

Summaries

References

External links
Official website

2016 in Australian field hockey
Masters Hockey World Cup
International field hockey competitions hosted by Australia